Alamein Range is a mountain range lying west of Canham Glacier, in the Freyberg Mountains of Antarctica. Named in association with Lord Bernard Freyberg and the Second New Zealand Expeditionary Force by the Northern Party of New Zealand Geological Survey Antarctic Expedition (NZGSAE), 1963–64. The mountain range is situated on the Pennell Coast, a portion of Antarctica lying between Cape Williams and Cape Adare.

Key mountains 
 Benoit Peak is a peak 5 nautical miles (9 km) north-northeast of Mount Camelot. Mapped by United States Geological Survey (USGS) from surveys and U.S. Navy air photos, 1960–64. Named by Advisory Committee on Antarctic Names (US-ACAN) for Robert E. Benoit, biologist at McMurdo Station, summers 1966-67 and 1967–68.
 Mount Camelot is a mountain, 2,590 m, rising near the center of the Freyberg Mountains and being the highest summit of this group. Named by the New Zealand Antarctic Place-Names Committee (NZ-APC) in 1968. The mountain is of geological interest as one of the localities where the sub-beacon erosion surface is exposed.

Features
Geographical features of Amamein Range include:

 Canham Glacier
 Takrouna Bluff

References

Mountain ranges of Victoria Land
Pennell Coast